Johnson County Savings Bank, also known as Iowa State Bank, is a historic building located in Iowa City, Iowa, United States. The design of the structure shows the influence of the Chicago Commercial style of architecture and that of architect Louis Sullivan. These influences are found in the building's arrangement with a base, shaft, and capital. The decorative elements executed in stone and terra cotta show the influence of Neoclassical architecture. The building was individually listed on the National Register of Historic Places in 2017. In 2021, it was included as a contributing property in the Iowa City Downtown Historic District.

References

Commercial buildings completed in 1912
Buildings and structures in Iowa City, Iowa
National Register of Historic Places in Iowa City, Iowa
Bank buildings on the National Register of Historic Places in Iowa
Individually listed contributing properties to historic districts on the National Register in Iowa